This is the first edition of the tournament as part of the WTA 125K Series.

Yanina Wickmayer won the title, defeating Nicole Gibbs in the final 6–3, 7–6(7–4).

Seeds

Draw

Finals

Top half

Bottom half

Qualifying

Seeds

Qualifiers

Draw

First qualifier

Second qualifier

External links
 Main draw
 Qualifying draw

Carlsbad Classic - Singles
Carlsbad Classic - Singles